Martín Andrés Góngora Milán (born June 27, 1980) is an Uruguayan footballer currently playing for Gimnasia Concepcion in the Torneo Argentino A.

CLub career
On 16 December 2011, he signed a contract with Brazilian side Esporte Clube Pelotas to play the Campeonato Gaúcho.

International career
In 1999, he was called by Luis Matosas to participate in the Uruguay U-23 squad for the 1999 Pan American Games in Canada.

References

External links
 
 

1980 births
Living people
Uruguayan footballers
Association football goalkeepers
C.A. Bella Vista players
Club Guaraní players
Danubio F.C. players
Miramar Misiones players
Juventud de Las Piedras players
Racing Club de Montevideo players
El Tanque Sisley players
Uruguayan expatriate footballers
Expatriate footballers in Argentina
Expatriate footballers in Paraguay
Expatriate footballers in Brazil
Uruguayan expatriate sportspeople in Argentina
Uruguayan expatriate sportspeople in Paraguay
Uruguayan expatriate sportspeople in Brazil
Footballers from Paysandú